Gary Walsh (born 21 March 1968) is an English football coach and professional former footballer who is the head goalkeeping coach at West Bromwich Albion.

As a player, he was a goalkeeper from 1985 to 2006, notably playing Premier League football with Manchester United, Oldham Athletic, Middlesbrough, Bradford City and Wigan Athletic. He also played in Scotland for Airdrieonians. He was capped twice by at England U21 level.

Following his retirement he moved into coaching and has been the goalkeeping coach at Wigan Athletic, Derby County, Hartlepool United, Hull City and Aston Villa.

Playing career

Manchester United
Born in Wigan, Walsh left school in 1984 and signed for Wigan Athletic as an apprentice. He was originally a striker but was fielded as goalkeeper in a game being watched by a Manchester United scout. He was promptly offered an apprenticeship by Manchester United manager Ron Atkinson, and accepted the offer. He kept goal for United as they finished runners-up to neighbouring Manchester City in the 1986 FA Youth Cup.

Walsh was given a professional contract for the 1986–87 season (during which Ron Atkinson was sacked in favour of Alex Ferguson) and made his first-team debut soon after. He played 14 league games that season.

For a short time in the 1987–88 season, a 19-year-old Walsh was made first-choice goalkeeper after Gary Bailey retired due to injury and Chris Turner was dropped from the team. He played in 16 league games before his run in the first team was halted by a head injury sustained in a mid-season friendly in Bermuda, and a succession of further injuries ruled him out until the 1990–91 season. He was on the substitutes bench as United lifted the UEFA Cup Winners' Cup that season, and the arrival of Peter Schmeichel that summer made his first-team opportunities even more limited.

The return of Les Sealey (who had been at United for 18 months until the end of the 1990–91 season) in January 1993 meant that Walsh was now third-choice goalkeeper, and the following season, he was transfer-listed. He had also been out the squad for a while before Sealey's arrival, as United had brought in Fraser Digby on loan from Swindon Town as an (unused) understudy to Peter Schmeichel.

However, United won the league title that season with three matches to spare, and to prepare his best players for the FA Cup final, Alex Ferguson selected Walsh as goalkeeper for the final three league games of the season and Walsh's form was so impressive that he gained a new contract, while the veteran Les Sealey was released. Walsh was on the substitute's bench as United triumphed 4–0 over Chelsea in the FA Cup Final on 14 May 1994 to complete the Double.

While at Old Trafford, Walsh went on loan to Airdrieonians and Oldham Athletic.

A back injury suffered by Peter Schmeichel in November 1994 saw Walsh selected for 10 subsequent Premier League games, during which he conceded just 12 goals, while the Dane recovered. Walsh also played in several Football League Cup and European Cup games that season, though when Schmeichel returned to fitness Walsh was back on the substitute's bench or in the reserves. Had United won the league title that season, Walsh would have collected the first (and ultimately the only) league title winner's medal of his career as he had met the minimum requirement for appearances to gain the accolade, but United were beaten to the league title by Blackburn Rovers on the final day of the season when they failed to get the better of a West Ham United side who held them to a 1–1 draw in east London.

Middlesbrough
A little frustrated at the lack of first team opportunities available to him, Walsh moved to Middlesbrough (managed by his former teammate Bryan Robson) for £600,000 in August 1995, and played in 32 out of 38 Premier League games that season for a newly promoted side which went fourth in October but in the end could only manage a 12th-place finish due to a terrible run of form during the winter. The following season, however, he managed just 12 league appearances due to the emergence of Ben Roberts and the arrival of Mark Schwarzer. Middlesbrough also managed to reach both domestic cup finals that season. In the League Cup campaign, Walsh played in the quarter final victory over Liverpool, but was not selected in the final squad against Leicester City, who beat Middlesbrough in a replay. In the FA Cup run he played in the opening game of the campaign against Chester City, but would not feature in the tournament again as his teammates went on to lose the final 2–0 to Chelsea. Walsh never played first team football for the Riverside club again.

Bradford City
He signed for Bradford City on loan in October 1997 before a £500,000 fee made the transfer permanent.

Walsh produced his best form in a number of years in the 1997–98 season and crowned a superb campaign by picking up the club's Player of the Year award. The following season, he was the first-choice goalkeeper as Bradford won promotion to the Premier League. He remained first-choice in the Premier League until he suffered an injury that saw Matt Clarke take over; Clarke's form meant Walsh slipped down the pecking order. After several troubled months, he began the 2000–01 season campaign fully fit and ready to fight for his place (he also went on loan to former club Middlesbrough during this time).

Wigan Athletic
He featured strongly over the next few years before joining Wigan Athletic in 2003 as back-up to John Filan. On Wigan's promotion to the Premier League in 2005, he signed a new one-year contract to see the club through their first as a top division side.

Having played three league games for Wigan, Walsh announced his retirement from playing in the summer of 2006.

Coaching career
Walsh started his goalkeeping coach role during his playing time at Wigan, before taking it up on a permanent basis after he retired at the end of the 2005–06 season. He teamed up with former Wigan manager Paul Jewell at Derby County on 3 January 2008. Following Jewell's departure from Derby, Walsh left in June 2009 and was appointed goalkeeping coach of Hartlepool United. On 15 December 2011, Walsh was recruited by his former Middlesbrough teammate Nick Barmby to take over as goalkeeping coach at Hull City.

On 1 November 2016, Walsh left Hull City and joined former Hull City manager Steve Bruce at Aston Villa as goalkeeping coach. On 3 October 2018, head coach Steve Bruce and his entire coaching staff, including Walsh, were fired by the club.

Honours
Manchester United 
FA Cup: 1993–94
FA Charity Shield: 1994
European Cup Winners' Cup: 1990–91
European Super Cup: 1991

Bradford City
Football League First Division: 1998–99 runners-up

References

External links

1968 births
Living people
Footballers from Wigan
English footballers
Association football goalkeepers
Manchester United F.C. players
Airdrieonians F.C. (1878) players
Oldham Athletic A.F.C. players
Middlesbrough F.C. players
Bradford City A.F.C. players
Wigan Athletic F.C. players
English Football League players
Premier League players
Scottish Football League players
England under-21 international footballers
Wigan Athletic F.C. non-playing staff
Derby County F.C. non-playing staff
Hartlepool United F.C. non-playing staff
Hull City A.F.C. non-playing staff
Aston Villa F.C. non-playing staff
Association football goalkeeping coaches